Trim is a transitway station in the east end of Ottawa, Ontario, located near Trim Road and Regional Road 174 (former Highway 17). A Natrel factory is located near this station.

Trim station once served as the eastern weekday terminus for the OC Transpo Transitway route 95, but is now served every day of the week, with Rapid Route 39 travelling between Blair and Millennium stations. Before October 2019, there was no rapid weekend service at the station, as it was mostly used a stop for servicing commuters who were using the Park and Ride facility that contains about 1,089 parking spaces.

There are plans to possibly add a transitway extension into residential neighbourhoods along Innes Road and Trim Road, while it remains mostly rural to the east towards Cumberland Village and Rockland.

During the summer, special service to nearby Petrie Island Beach is provided on weekends.

This station will serve as the eastern terminus for the O-Train Confederation Line beginning in 2025.

Service 

The following routes serve Trim:

Notes 
 Route  towards or from Blair station does not travel past this station during the late evenings on weekdays.
 Route  only operates on weekends during the summer months.

References

External links

Railway stations scheduled to open in 2025
Transitway (Ottawa) stations